1 Cancri is a single star in the zodiac constellation of Cancer, positioned near the border with Gemini at a distance of around 467 light years from the Sun. It is barely visible to the naked eye as a dim, orange-hued star with an apparent visual magnitude of 5.97. The object is moving further from the Earth with a heliocentric radial velocity of +14 km/s.

This is an evolved giant star with a stellar classification of K3− III, having exhausted the hydrogen at its core and expanded. It is specified as a spectral standard for that type.

References

Cancri, 01
Cancer (constellation)
Durchmusterung objects
Cancri, 01
064960
038848
3095